Inverkip railway station is a railway station serving the village of Inverkip, Inverclyde, Scotland.

The embankment is all that remains of the former Down platform. All of the station buildings have now been removed and replaced with a bus shelter. The flats at the station (known as The Kyles) are built in what was the station goods yard. There was also a coal yard located in this area. Inverkip also had its own signal box, located at the end of the down platform. A camping coach was positioned here by the Scottish Region from 1959 to 1969, from 1963 it was a Pullman camping coach.  At the further end of the yard area, where the housing development is located, are the parapets of a metal overbridge, presumably used to move goods across from the up platform.

The station, built in 1865, was substantially modified in 2012 to accommodate the erection of a footbridge with an integrated lift. This structure was required as a planning permission clause related to the construction of a new housing estate in the fields across the line from the station. It was not possible to fit a ramped bridge in the available space, hence the need for a lift, making Inverkip one of the few unmanned stations in Scotland to have a lift (other examples can be found at ) The shelter was replaced and relocated further west and the steps from station Avenue were relocated slightly further east. Temporary steps were put in place during the year-long construction project. The lift serves the platform level and the footbridge level. Strangely, it is necessary to exit the station in order to access the steps to the footbridge since there are no steps directly from the platform to the bridge. There are no steps to the bridge on the other side of the line due to the steep embankment there.

Groundworks for the footbridge started in 2011, with the main span being lifted into place in the early hours of 15 July 2012. The bridge was formally opened in December 2012. A Park & Ride car park with 26 spaces was also opened across the line from the station at that time.

Services 
The station is served by Class 318s, Class 320s, Class 380s and Class 385s.

Gallery

References

External links 

Railway stations in Inverclyde
Former Caledonian Railway stations
Railway stations in Great Britain opened in 1865
SPT railway stations
Railway stations served by ScotRail